The Bosnian-Podrinje Canton Goražde, until 2001 Goražde Canton is one of ten cantons of the Federation of Bosnia and Herzegovina, an entity in Bosnia and Herzegovina.

Demographics

2013 Census

Geography
It is located in the south-eastern central part of the country, in the region of Upper Drina. The cantonal seat is in Goražde.

Municipalities
The canton consists of the municipalities of Goražde, Pale-Prača, Foča-Ustikolina.

See also
 Drina Banovina
 Podrinje
 List of heads of the Bosnia-Podrinje Canton Goražde

References

 
Cantons of the Federation of Bosnia and Herzegovina